The Country Code and The Countryside Code are sets of rules for visitors to rural, and especially agricultural, regions of the United Kingdom. The Country Code dates back to the 1930s and the Countryside Code replaced it in 2004.

The original rules
The Country Code evolved from the work of various organisations and had several different versions from the 1930s. The most widely accepted version of The Country Code was published in 1981 by the Countryside Commission:

Enjoy the countryside and respect its life and work 
Guard against all risk of fire
Fasten all gates
Keep your dogs under close control
Keep to public paths across farmland
Use gates and stiles to cross fences, hedges and walls
Leave livestock, crops and machinery alone
Take your litter home
Help to keep all water clean
Protect wildlife, plants and trees
Take special care on country roads
Make no unnecessary noise

In the 1960s and 70s the Country Code was publicised by several public information films shown in cinemas and on television.

At some point after 1981, the instruction to fasten all gates was replaced with one to instead leave gates as found.

The Countryside Code

In 2004 The Country Code was revised and relaunched as The Countryside Code (Côd Cefn Gwlad in Welsh) to reflect the introduction of new open access rights and changes in society over the preceding years.  The revised Code was produced through a partnership between the Countryside Agency and the Countryside Council for Wales
Be safe - plan ahead and follow any signs
Leave gates and property as you find them
Protect plants and animals, and take your litter home
Keep dogs under close control
Consider other people

COVID-19 version
In early July 2020, the Westminster government published an amended short version of the code online during the COVID-19 pandemic as lockdown was being eased across England to help manage public access to the countryside under the changed circumstances.

The Scottish Outdoor Access Code
 
In Scotland, where there is a more general right of access, Scottish Natural Heritage developed The Scottish Outdoor Access Code, which was approved in draft form by the Scottish Parliament in July 2003 following the passing of the Land Reform (Scotland) Act of the same year, and was accepted in February 2005. The Scottish Outdoor Access Code differs significantly from The Country Code in that it promotes access rights that include crossing over land and non-motorised recreational activities like walking, cycling, angling and horse riding, and will normally apply in all rural settings. The basis of access rights over land (in Scotland) is of shared responsibilities, in that those exercising such rights have to act responsibly, following the Scottish Outdoor Access Code, while land owners/managers have a reciprocal responsibility in respecting the interests of those who exercise their rights.

The Scottish code "is based on three key principles [which] apply equally to the public and to land managers":
 Take personal responsibility for your own actions.
 Respect people's privacy and peace of mind.
 Help land managers and others to work safely and effectively.
Three additional principles apply to visitors:
 Care for your environment.
 Keep your dog under proper control.
 Take extra care if you are organising an event or running a business.

Both the Countryside Code and the Scottish code provide guidance for land managers as well as visitors.

See also

 Leave No Trace
 Tread Lightly!
 Trail ethics

References

External links
 English Countryside Code Retrieved 13 January 2017
 Scottish Outdoor Access Code Retrieved 13 January 2017
 Welsh Countryside Code Retrieved 13 January 2017

Agriculture in the United Kingdom
Rural society in the United Kingdom